Super Force is an American action-adventure TV series which aired from October 1990 to May 1992.

The series is about a former astronaut turned cop who uses a highly advanced powered exoskeleton and motorcycle to fight crime in the city of Metroplex during the then future year of 2020. Among the features of the black battle suit were enhanced strength and armament and a force field that protected the wearer from virtually all known weapons, whereas the motorcycle had an array of James Bond-type gadgets and weapons.

Syndicated by Viacom, Super Force was designed to be a companion series to Superboy, and the second series in a proposed two-hour block of action programming that also included Lightning Force. Unusual for a series that only ran 30 minutes per episode, Super Force debuted with a two-hour TV pilot film, which was later split into four episodes for syndication purposes.

Plot summary

Astronaut Zachary Stone (Ken Olandt) returns from his acclaimed deep-space mission to Mars to find that his father is dead and that his police detective brother Frank (Marshall R. Teague) is missing, presumed murdered and falsely accused of being a crooked cop due to fabricated computer evidence. Frustrated at the seeming lack of concern or progress by the authorities, Zach takes it upon himself to find those responsible and bring them to justice, joining the Metroplex Police Department as a detective under precinct captain Carla Frost (Lisa Niemi).

After his first failed attempt almost leads to his death in Metroplex's aptly-named "Crime Zone", Zach meets F.X. Spinner (Larry B. Scott), a research scientist at Hungerford Industries who has developed a prototype suit of space armor that was never put into production due to lack of government funding.  After the murder of Hungerford Industries founder E.B. Hungerford (Patrick Macnee), a close friend of the Stone family, Zach convinces F.X. to modify the suit for urban warfare purposes.

Combining the armor with an experimental heavily-armed, jet-propelled motorcycle, the two form the backbone of the vigilantism crime-fighting team called "Super Force", ably assisted by the Hungerford Computer (voiced by Macnee), an artificial intelligence supercomputer created from a blend of Hungerford's personal records, psychological profile and company files to convince the world that the brilliant and charming but somewhat reclusive British billionaire scientist is still alive so that his company would not fall into the wrong hands.

During Season Two, Zach added enhanced strength, intelligence, and senses, as well as a limited form of extrasensory perception to his crime-fighting repertoire, the result of a neural link with the computerized Hungerford and his near-death experience in the final episode of Season One.  Also joining the Super Force team that season was Esper Division police officer Zander Tyler (Musetta Vander).

The RoboCop-inspired Super Force suit, motorcycle, and nightstick were designed and built by Robert Short, the special effects expert who also created the red superhero suit worn by John Wesley Shipp in the 1990 live-action TV series The Flash.

Satori, a recurring villain in Season One, was played by G. Gordon Liddy, the man famous for planning the Watergate scandal break-in. Other guest stars with interesting pasts included lysergic acid diethylamide guru Timothy Leary and former adult film stars Traci Lords and Ginger Lynn.

Characters

Heroes
Zach Stone – The main protagonist. A former astronaut, the tough-talking, wisecracking Zach has taken his (supposedly) deceased brother's place on the police force. However, due to the increasingly violent crimes and the slow progress of police work, Zach secretly takes on the role of the armored vigilante Super Force. As Super Force, Zach's armor increases his physical strength, surrounds him with a force field generated by a built-in graviton-powered electrokinetic deflector system, allows him to see at telescopic ranges, and fires a laser from the visual enhancement device on the samurai-style helmet.  Among other weapons, the suit comes with a special high-tech baton that, in addition to its regular club-like function, shoots energy blasts, grappling hook, tracking devices, and even a fire retardant spray. In the second season, in addition to becoming four times stronger than he was before, Zach gains greatly-increased powers of perception that include not only minor psychic abilities, but also a limited form of X-ray vision, which allows him to see into the infrared and ultraviolet ends of the spectrum and detect energy sources through solid barriers. With the addition of these new talents, he now only becomes Super Force when absolutely necessary, and in many Season Two episodes, he does not don his signature armor at all.
F.X. Spinner – A former gang member given a second chance thanks to Frank Stone and E.B. Hungerford, the black, stylish, glasses-wearing Franklin Xavier Spinner is the techno-genius of the team, using his electronics knowledge to repair and upgrade the suit and create new gadgets as necessary. On occasion, F.X. even ventures into the field himself, including once dressing up in the Super Force armor to free Zach from brainwashing, or going undercover in an amusement park with a dark secret. In the episode "Yo! Super Force!", it's revealed that he has three cousins who also work as undercover agents.
E.B. Hungerford – The head of Hungerford Industries who had served as both Zach and F.X.'s mentor, E.B. is killed in the first quarter of the pilot movie. But he lives on as a pixelated Max Headroom-style computer simulation which has all the knowledge, intelligence, and personality of the original and can instantly access all files in his company's database and just as quickly interface with other computer systems worldwide in search of information.  In the episodes "There's a Light"/"At the End of the Tunnel" he sets up a neural link with Zach's brain that helps save his life and allows E.B. to monitor Zach's bio-readings and come to his electronic aid when needed.
Captain Carla Frost – Zach's beautiful blonde boss during Season One, Captain Frost dresses like a glamorous New Wave model but is a tough, dedicated, no-nonsense cop down to her very core.  Frost does not know who Super Force is, but is grateful for any help she can get bringing law and order back to the Crime Zone; she defends his actions both to her superiors and the media. Divorced, Frost used to date Zach's brother Frank before her promotion to captain, and she still believes in his innocence, at one point revealing to Zach that she suspects that Frank might in fact secretly be Super Force.
Zander Tyler – A skilled psychic in Metroplex Police Department's secret Esper Division, Zander risked her life and sanity to save Zach at the opening of Season Two by mentally drawing him back from the threshold between life and death; they share a special bond throughout the rest of the series.  The exotic, dark-haired Zander was called in to help because she had worked with Hungerford before on Project Lazarus, which attempted to transfer a living mind into a computer – research that proved invaluable to E.B.'s own computerized resurrection.  With a lively sense of humor and a bit of a flirtatious side, Zander is more sensitive and emotional than the steely Captain Frost due to her ESP, but is just as tough when the chips are down. She finds that she has more in common with Zach and his friends than she does with her more annoyingly "New Age" colleagues in the Esper Division.
Frank Stone – Zach's older brother and his role model as a police officer. In the eyes of the authorities, Frank Stone Jr. was a good cop gone bad and believed dead. Actually, he had been investigating Tao Satori only to be kidnapped by the sinister head of Satori International, who set out to destroy the detective's reputation, first by creating an android assassin in his image in the pilot and then by brainwashing Stone himself into becoming one of his warriors. Zach was able to free his brother from Satori's brainwashing, and now Frank works deep undercover armed with his own suit of Super Force armor, letting the world believe that he is still dead as he tries to bring down his family's powerful archenemy.  More often referred to than seen, and then usually in a flashback to happier days.

Villains
Tao Satori – The main villain of the series. The soft-spoken Satori poses as a great international humanitarian, but is secretly a ruthless criminal mastermind. It's because of him that Super Force exists, and several of the show's first season episodes involve an evil plot of his. A mustached and balding white businessman sent to prison for a savings and loan association by Zach's father, Satori reinvented himself by living a quiet and contemplative traditional Japanese lifestyle steeped in Eastern philosophy, all the while secretly weaving the most diabolical schemes for world domination that range from android duplicates to black hole-creating gravity bombs. Respectfully addressed as "Satori-san" in public, Satori's men usually refer to him in private as "oyabun", the Japanese word for "godfather".
Mink Navarro – A local crime boss who appears in the Season One episode "Water Mania" and is mentioned throughout Season Two.
The Merkels – Not so much villains as comic relief antagonists, the obnoxious, gung-ho Captain Avery Merkel (Antoni Corone) and his brother Francis (Tom Kachalakos) head the SWAT squad and hate the armor-clad hero for interfering with police business and making SPLAT look bad. Dedicated, highly-trained officers, and by no means stupid, the brothers are easily distracted by their need for publicity and lack of a love life. Avery is under the mistaken impression that Super Force is a robot.

Episodes

Season One
"It is the year 2020, and the world has changed. In 2020, times are tough. This man's tougher."

Season Two
"Out of the fire of Earth attraction. Beyond the limits of the world where man and machine and spirit unite. Born by the power of lightning into the twenty-first century. It is the end of the beginning. It is the time of Super Force."

Home media
On September 19, 2017, it was announced that Visual Entertainment Inc. had acquired the rights to the series. They subsequently released Super Force – The Complete Series on DVD in Region 1 on October 12, 2017.

References

External links

1990 American television series debuts
1992 American television series endings
Television series set in 2020
1990s American science fiction television series
Fictional cars
Television series by CBS Studios
Motorcycle television series